Biman Bandar is a metro station of Kolkata Metro (unofficially known as Airport metro station). It will serve the city's main airport, the Netaji Subhas Chandra Bose International Airport.

Features
This station will also have a yard, and it will be the largest underground facility of India, and city's first. It will be 550m long and 41.6m wide, and will facilitate stabling and reversal of rakes, but it will not be a carshed. Previously the station was planned elevated, but after objection from AAI, the route was reworked and the station was planned underground from Airport to New Barrackpore.

Facilities
It will be 500 m away from the current terminal building and 150 m from the proposed new terminal building but it will be connected via subways which will be having walkalators, then there will be escalator or elevator to reach the arrival or the departure levels. Counters for luggage check-in could be set up at the station and there might be a dedicated corridor for transporting the luggage to the boarding point. Also a longer corridor would be built for passengers to reach Jessore Road.

Intersections
Here, Kolkata Metro Line 4 and Line 6 will meet. There will be 6 tracks, two for Line 4, two for Line 6, one for terminating and departing both Noapara and Barasat bound trains and one for the yard.

History

Construction 
The execution of this project has been entrusted to RVNL and the construction of the station-cum-yard is being done by ITD Cementation India Ltd. The tentative deadline is December 2021.

Delays 
The work has been delayed for years due to multiple issues. At first AAI objected the station above the ground, stating that this could be a threat for air traffic. Many underground utilities, power sub-station and water treatment plant had to be shifted. Encroachments and Land acquisition problems held up the project for multiple times.

The Station

Layout

Connections

Rail 
Previously Eastern Railway operated Suburban Railway services (Kolkata Circular Railway) up to here. Currently the nearest stations are Dum Dum Cantonment railway station and Dum Dum Junction railway station.

Air 
The metro station itself is in the Netaji Subhash Chandra Bose International Airport area.

See also 
 List of Kolkata Metro stations

References 

Kolkata Metro stations
Railway stations in Kolkata